Ashkezar (also Romanized as Ashkez̄ar, Āshkakzār, and Ashkaz̄ar; also known as Ash Kuzar, Askīzār, and Ashk Dez) is a city in the Central District of Ashkezar County, Yazd province, Iran, and serves as capital of the county. At the 2006 census, its population was 13,800 in 3,711 households. The following census in 2011 counted 15,663 people in 4,626 households. The latest census in 2016 showed a population of 19,123 people in 5,799 households.

References 

Ashkezar County

Cities in Yazd Province

Populated places in Yazd Province

Populated places in Ashkezar County